The State Prison in Nyborg is a closed state prison, which was built in 1913 at the town of Nyborg in Denmark.

In the beginning it was used to place young inmates, who needed a special educational effort. From 1933 to 1973 the prison had a special section for young people, but since 1973 the prison have functioned as a plain closed state prison for males from Jutland and Funen.

The prison have 231 seats in total, of which 24 seats are under the arrest department used by the Police of Denmark.  The State Prison in Nyborg employs about 300 people.

It was home to Knud Pedersen leader of the Churchill club in WW2.

Nyborg
Government buildings completed in 1913
1913 establishments in Denmark
Nyborg